The men's 1500 metres event at the 1998 World Junior Championships in Athletics was held in Annecy, France, at Parc des Sports on 31 July and 2 August.

Medalists

Results

Final
2 August

Heats
31 July

Heat 1

Heat 2

Heat 3

Participation
According to an unofficial count, 34 athletes from 26 countries participated in the event.

References

1500 metres
1500 metres at the World Athletics U20 Championships